Thomas Walker (3 May 1804 – 2 September 1886) was a New South Wales colonial politician, merchant banker and philanthropist. At the time of his death, he was one of the wealthiest and most influential colonialists in New South Wales.

He was the father of Dame Eadith Walker and founder of Yaralla Estate. The Thomas Walker Hospital was named in his honor.

Life and career
Thomas Walker was born at Leith, Scotland, in 1804, and came to Sydney as a young man. About the year 1822 he joined the firm of Riley and Walker, general merchants, the senior partner of which was his uncle. Some years later he acquired this business in partnership with a cousin, and carried it on successfully. He was made a magistrate in 1835. In 1837, he visited Port Phillip district. In 1838, he published, anonymously, an account of his experiences under the title, A Month in the Bush of Australia.

In 1843 he was elected one of the representatives of the Electoral district of Port Phillip in the first partially elected New South Wales Legislative Council, and in January 1845 he was one of the six members of the council who signed a petition praying that Port Phillip should be made into a separate colony. Walker, however, gave up taking an active part in politics, though he kept his interest in them and published some pamphlets on the land question. His financial affairs prospered, and he invested widely. His special interest was the Bank of New South Wales, of which he was president for many years before his death. The statement that he was one of the original founders of the bank is not correct, but his uncle was one of the early shareholders. Walker was a conscientious, benevolent man who went about doing good. He took a personal interest in his benefactions, and at one period employed an agent, searching out and relieving cases of distress and yet most of his benevolent activity was impersonal and detached. In 1882, just before taking a trip to Europe, he distributed £10,000 among benevolent institutions.

He married Jane Steel Hart on 25 July 1860, when he was 56 and she was 28 years old. There was one child of the marriage, Eadith. Jane died on 26 January 1870 and was buried at St John's Ashfield.

In 1876 he generously funded a parcel of land in Ashfield to provide a new residence for the Sydney Foundling Hospital l, (Now The Infants' Home Child and Family Services).

Legacy

Walker died in 1886 in Concord, New South Wales, and was buried in the cemetery at St John's Ashfield, He left a large fortune, and was survived by his daughter Eadith.

Under a codicil in Walker's will, £100,000 was set aside to found the Thomas Walker Convalescent Hospital in the Sydney suburb of Concord West. The hospital was duly designed by Sir John Sulman in the Federation Free Classical style and built in 1893. In its first 20 years nearly 18,000 convalescent patients, all non-paying, received the benefit of this hospital. In the early 1900s, author Henry Lawson was several times a patient there, treated for his alcoholism.

After the death of Dame Eadith Walker 51 years later, two-thirds of the income from £300,000 of his estate was set aside for the upkeep of this hospital. Another £100,000 was used to found the Dame Eadith Walker Convalescent Hospital, which was established in the family home, the Victorian Italianate mansion Yaralla, on the banks of the Parramatta River. One-third of the income from another sum of £300,000 was set aside for its maintenance. The remaining two-thirds of the income was appropriated for the upkeep of the Thomas Walker Convalescent Hospital and the cottages built by Dame Eadith Walker. She had devoted her life to philanthropy, making the poor and distressed her special concern. She supplemented her father's endowment of his hospital, gave liberally to other hospitals, and worked on many committees.

The Thomas Walker Hospital is now known as Rivendell Child, Adolescent and Family Unit and specialises in the treatment of young people with problems. Yaralla Estate still survives as the Dame Eadith Walker Hospital. Both hospitals are listed on the Register of the National Estate.

Notes

References
 

J. MacCulloch, 'Walker, Dame Eadith Campbell (1861–1937)', Australian Dictionary of Biography, Volume 12, Melbourne University Press, 1990, pp 356–357.
 

Australian philanthropists
Members of the New South Wales Legislative Council
1804 births
1886 deaths
People from Leith
Scottish emigrants to Australia
19th-century Australian politicians
Presidents of the Bank of New South Wales
19th-century philanthropists
19th-century Australian businesspeople